Park Avenue Baptist Church is a historic church at 296 Park Ave., West in Mansfield, Ohio.

It was built in 1928 and added to the National Register of Historic Places in 1983.

The Mansfield-based firm of Althouse & Jones also designed the Richland Trust Building.

References

Mansfield ParkAve
Mansfield ParkAve
Mansfield ParkAve
Mansfield ParkAve
Mansfield ParkAve
Churches in Mansfield, Ohio